Egor Vladislavovich Druzhinin (born 12 March 1972) is а Russian actor, film director and choreographer.

 Laureate of the Golden Mask.

Biography
Egor Druzhinin was born in Leningrad, Russian SFSR, Soviet Union (now Saint Petersburg, Russia). His father was choreographer Vladislav Druzhinin who worked in Komissarjevsky Theatre and in his own studio of pantomime called “Kvadrat”. Egor became famous after playing the main role in two comedian films Adventures of Petrov and Vasechkin, Usual and Incredible and Vacation of Petrov and Vasechkin, Usual and Incredible. He also has step-sister Lisa who is 18 years younger.

After graduating from Saint Petersburg State Theatre Arts Academy, he worked in Leningrad Young People’s Theatre. Since 1994 Druzhinin had been studying in New York City in Alvin Ailey American Dance Theater. After a few years of studying in USA Egor came back to Saint Petersburg and started working as choreographer. He worked with performers such as Philipp Kirkorov, Laima Vaikule etc. In 2002 Egor played one of main parts in Russian adaptation of musical Chicago. Druzhinin was working not only as dancer but also as actor. He played significant roles in several films like “Ali-Baba and forty robbers”. He taught choreography participants of the TV project  Fabrika Zvyozd. In 2004 and 2005 he took part in musicals Cats and The Twelve Chairs. Currently, Druzhinin is a producer, a choreographer, a performer in his own play “Life everywhere” and a judge in show “Tancy on TNT”.

Private life
Egor Druzhinin is married to the actress Veronica Ickovich. They have three children: daughter Alexandra and sons Tihon and Platon.

Filmography

Actor

Director
 2005 - Night in the style of childhood
 2009 - First Love  
 2013 - Hello, I'm your Friday! (TV series)

References

External links 

1972 births
Living people
Male actors from Saint Petersburg
Soviet male child actors
Russian male film actors
Russian male voice actors
20th-century Russian male actors
21st-century Russian male actors
Russian  theatre directors
Russian film directors
Russian choreographers
Mass media people from Saint Petersburg